Likely Suspects is an American crime drama that aired from September 11, 1992 to January 14, 1993.

Premise
The show was an interactive crime drama where the viewer was treated as a rookie partner.

Cast
Sam McMurray as Detective Marshak
Jason Schombing as Detective Harry Spinoza

Episodes

References

External links

1992 American television series debuts
1993 American television series endings
1990s American crime drama television series
English-language television shows
Fox Broadcasting Company original programming
Television shows set in Pennsylvania